AMSYSCO, Inc. is a Post-Tensioning supplier based in Romeoville, Illinois.  AMSYSCO, Inc. has an unbonded plant that it is certified under the Post-Tensioning Institute 'Plant Certification' program.

Business Segments
The company is involved in five major business segments: arts & sports stadiums, commercial buildings, commercial multi-family housing, parking structures, and barrier cable.

History
AMSYSCO, Inc. was founded in 1981 by Rattan Khosa.
In 1984, AMSYSCO, Inc. joined the Post-Tensioning Institute, and in 1999, Rattan Khosa was elected President of Post-Tensioning Institute for a two-year term.
In 2008,  AMSYSCO, Inc. was awarded the Post-Tensioning Institute's "Project of the Year - Award of Excellence" for the New Guthrie Theater in Minneapolis, Minnesota.

Notable Projects
1998 – Minneapolis-Saint Paul International Airport Parking Structures (Minneapolis, MN)
2004 – Epic Campus (Verona, WI)
2005 – 340 On The Park Condominiums (Chicago, IL)
2006 – Lumiere Casino (St. Louis, MO)
2007 – Indianapolis International Airport Parking Structures (Indianapolis, IN)
2008 – New Guthrie Theater (Minneapolis, MN)
2009 – Minnesota Twins Ballpark 'Target Field' (Minneapolis, MN)

References

"Entrepreneurial Internship Program Sponsors", Chicago Booth Polsky Center.
"Hopewell Ventures finds good VC value in Midwest", Chicago Sun Times.
"Another Twins ballpark milestone reached on Wednesday", Minnesota Twins MLB website.
"Post-Tensioning Institute Plant Certification", Post-Tensioning Institute.
"PTI recognizes AMSYSCO with its top 2008 award", Concrete Monthly.
"A Creative and Cost-Efficient Structural System", Engineer News Record.
"The Leaders Speak", Engineer News Record.
"Record-Height of a Post-Tensioned Residential Building Another First for Chicago", PTI Journal.
"St. Louis Casino stays afloat with post-tensioned concrete", Engineer News Record.
"Post-Tensioning leads to Airport Modernization", Amsysco.

External links
 AMSYSCO Inc.
 AMSYSCO Blog

Construction and civil engineering companies of the United States
Manufacturing companies based in Illinois
Companies based in Will County, Illinois
Romeoville, Illinois
American companies established in 1921
Construction and civil engineering companies established in 1981
Manufacturing companies established in 1981
1981 establishments in Illinois